Darwin College Boat Club (DCBC)  is the official rowing club for members of Darwin College, Cambridge, a constituent college of the University of Cambridge.

Darwin's blades are Royal Blue and include three vertical stripes, scarlet, Cambridge Blue and yellow based upon the colours of the three colleges that established Darwin College namely St John's College, Cambridge, Gonville & Caius, and Trinity College, Cambridge.

The Darwin College Boat Club has a high participation rate and is one of the most popular sports clubs at the college. Darwin College Boat Club has performed well in the May Bumps and Lent Bumps in recent years and has competed in the first division.

Notable alumni of the Darwin College Boat Club include Helen McFie, a British rower who was also a member of the Cambridge University Boat Club.

History
Darwin College Boat Club was founded in 1969 by the late Dr Chester White. Since then, DCBC has become a successful graduate boat club in Cambridge.

Boathouse

Honours
Darwin M1 won blades in Lent Bumps 2005 and May Bumps 2014. Darwin W2 got blades in May Bumps 2006. Darwin M3 won blades in May Bumps 2013. Darwin College currently has 5 boats (3 men's and 2 women's) in May Bumps.

Notable alumni
Notable Darwin alumni who have participated as rowers for Darwin College Boat Club include Helen McFie, a retired Scottish rower who as a member of the Cambridge University Boat Club won the 1971 and 1972 Boat Races and who competed for Great Britain at the 1975 World Rowing Championships.

References

External links
 CUCBC Cambridge University Combined Boat Club
 Darwin College Boat Club

Rowing clubs of the University of Cambridge
Boat
Sports clubs established in 1969
1969 establishments in England
Rowing clubs in Cambridgeshire
Rowing clubs in England
Rowing clubs of the River Cam